The 1979 Grand Prix d'Automne was the 73rd edition of the Paris–Tours cycle race and was held on 30 September 1979. The race started in Blois and finished in Chaville. The race was won by Joop Zoetemelk.

General classification

References

1979 in French sport
1979
September 1979 sports events in Europe
1979 Super Prestige Pernod